The Thai Ambassador in Ottawa is the official representative of the Government in Bangkok to the Government of Canada.

List of representatives

 Canada–Thailand relations

References 

 
Canada
Thailand